Sabahattin Çakmakoğlu (born 25 November 1930) is a Turkish bureaucrat and politician who served as the Minister of National Defense from 1999 to 2002. He was the Nationalist Movement Party presidential candidate for the 2007 presidential election, which he lost to the Justice and Development Party candidate Abdullah Gül. He served as a Member of Parliament for the electoral district of Kayseri from 1999 to 2002 and again from 2007 to 2011.

Beginning his career as a bureaucrat, Çakmakoğlu served as the Kaymakam (sub-Governor) of numerous districts before being appointed the Deputy Governor of Ankara. Serving as Deputy Governor for three years, Çakmakoğlu then served as the 28th Governor of Gümüşhane from 1972 to 1975, as the 28th Governor of Isparta from 1975 to 1978, as the 27th Governor of Edirne from February to August 1978, as the 27th Governor of Gaziantep from 1979 to 1980 and finally as the 31st Governor of Mersin from 1984 to 1988. In 1991, he was appointed as the non-partisan Minister of the Interior due to the constitutional requirement for the partisan Interior minister to vacate his or her office three months before a general election and hand it over to the Undersecretary of the Interior Ministry. Çakmakoğlu served as the Interior Minister until a new government was formed after the 1991 general election.

Early life and career
Sabahattin Çakmakoğlu was born on 25 November 1930 in İncesu, Kayseri. Having received his primary and secondary education in Kayseri, he graduated from Ankara University Faculty of Political Science in 1953. He became a Civilian Administrative Officer and a candidate to become a Kaymakam (a district governor, roughly translated as a 'sub-governor'). During his time as a Kaymakam candidate, he also graduated from the Ankara University Faculty of Law.

Bureaucratic career

Kaymakam
Çakmakoğlu spent 12 years serving as a Kaymakam in the districts of Kozaklı in Nevşehir Province, Gülşehir in Nevşehir Province, Ürgüp in Nevşehir Province, Çıldır in Ardahan Province, Bayburt in Gümüşhane Province and Ereğli in Konya Province. In 1989, the district of Bayburt became a Province in its own right.

Governor
Çakmakoğlu spent three years serving as the Deputy Governor of Ankara before being appointed as the 28th Governor of Gümüşhane from 1972 to 1975, as the 28th Governor of Isparta from 1975 to 1978, as the 27th Governor of Edirne from February to August 1978, as the 27th Governor of Gaziantep from 1979 to 1980 and finally as the 31st Governor of Mersin from 1984 to 1988.

Undersecretary
Between the years 1988 and 1992, Çakmakoğlu served in the General Directorate of Security, as the Undersecretary to the Prime Minister of Turkey and as the Undersecretary to the Minister of the Interior. In 1991, he was elected as a member of the Council of Higher Education (YÖK) from the Cabinet office contingency.

In 1992, after retirement, he served as the chief advisor to the President of Turkey, at the time Turgut Özal.

Minister of the Interior
With the Constitution requiring that the serving partisan Ministers of the Interior, of Transport and of Justice should vacate their position to their respective Undersecretaries at least three months before a general election, Çakmakoğlu took over from Mustafa Kalemli as Minister of the Interior on 30 August 1991, three months before the 1991 general election. He remained as Minister until a new government was formed, being succeeded by İsmet Sezgin when the coalition government between the True Path Party and the Social Democratic Populist Party (SHP) on 21 November 1991.

Political career
Çakmakoğlu first entered politics in 1992 by joining the Motherland Party (ANAP), but left the party to join the Nationalist Movement Party (MHP) in 1995. He served as an advisor to MHP leader Alparslan Türkeş until his death in 1997. On 23 November 1997, Çakmakoğlu was elected to the MHP party council and later became a Deputy Leader of the MHP. He was elected to Parliament as an MHP MP from Kayseri in the 1999 general election.

Minister of National Defense
Following the 1999 general election, the Democratic Left Party (DSP), the Nationalist Movement Party and the Motherland Party formed a triple coalition government. Çakmakoğlu was subsequently appointed as the Minister of National Defense. He served in the position until 18 November 2002. He lost his seat in the 2002 general election due to the MHP falling below the 10% election threshold necessary to win parliamentary representation.

Presidential candidacy
The MHP managed to win parliamentary representation once again in the 2007 general election, with Çakmakoğlu again returning as an MP for Kayseri. He became a Deputy Leader of the MHP for a second time shortly after. The general election had been called early due to the parliamentary deadlock caused during the presidential election earlier that year. With the parliamentary process to elect a successor to President Ahmet Necdet Sezer resuming after the general election, the MHP put forward Çakmakoğlu as their presidential candidate. He won 70 votes in the first round, 71 in the second and 70 in the final round, losing to the Justice and Development Party candidate Abdullah Gül.

Çakmakoğlu stepped down as an MP at the 2011 general election.

Personal life
Çakmakoğlu is married with two children. He has a secondary school named after him in his hometown of İncesu, Kayseri, namely Vali Sabahattin Çakmakoğlu Ortaokulu (Governor Sabahattin Çakmakoğlu Secondary School). A secondary school with the same name exists in Mersin Province, where Çakmakoğlu served as Governor between 1984 and 1988.

See also
Devlet Bahçeli
Abdullah Gül
Turgut Özal
List of Turkish civil servants

References

External links
Biography on the Parliament website
Collection of all relevant news items at Haberler.com

Nationalist Movement Party politicians
Living people
1930 births
Ankara University Faculty of Political Sciences alumni
People from İncesu, Kayseri
Ministers of National Defence of Turkey
Members of the 21st Parliament of Turkey
Members of the 23rd Parliament of Turkey
Ministers of the Interior of Turkey
Turkish civil servants
Deputies of Kayseri
Kaymakams